Treasures is an album by the band Night Ark released on June 20, 2000.

Track listing
"Picture"
"Homecoming"
"Trilogy: Part I - Birth"
"Moments"
"Adolescence"
"Of Song & Silence"
"Offering"
"Worm"
all tracks composed and arranged by Ara Dinkjian, except track 06 by Ara Dinkjian and Sid Clark

Personnel
Ara Dinkjian : cumbus (01,02,07), saz (02,07), mandolin (03), guitar (04,05), ud (04,06,08), kanun (04), piano (05), voice (05), kaval (07)
Arto Tuncboyaciyan : bendir (01,02,07), voice (01,03,04,06), percussion (02,03,04,06,07,08), lead voice (05), congas (06,08)
Armen Donelian : synthesizer (04,05,07), piano (04)
Shamira Shahinian : synthesizer (01,02,08), voice (01), piano (06), keyboards
Ed Schuller : bass (01,02,03,05,06,07,08), voice (01)
Recording Engineer : David Baker
Mastering Engineer : Bob Ludwig

2000 albums
Jazz albums by American artists